WNDB (1150 AM) is a commercial radio station broadcasting a talk radio format. Licensed to Daytona Beach, Florida, the station is owned by Southern Stone Communications.

WNDB is powered at 1,000 watts.  By day, it is non-directional.  But at night, to protect other stations on 1150 AM, it uses a directional antenna with a two-tower array.  Programming is also heard on 245-watt FM translator 93.5 W228CT and 250-watt FM translator 99.9 W260DO, both located in Daytona Beach.

Programming
WNDB carries nationally syndicated conservative talk programs including The Sean Hannity Show, Brian Kilmede and Friends, The Clay Travis and Buck Sexton Show, The Joe Pags Show, America in the Morning, This Morning, America's First News with Gordon Deal and Coast to Coast AM with George Noory.

WNDB is the "host station" of the annual Daytona 500 and is the flagship station for the Motor Racing Network.  NASCAR is headquartered in Daytona Beach, and MRN was based there until 2008, when the studios moved to Charlotte, North Carolina.  Most likely because of the MRN connection, WNDB broadcasts races from all three of the top series.

Website
The station's website, NewsDaytonaBeach.com, serves as its online publishing platform. The website releases daily news articles covering the Volusia County and Flagler County areas of Central Florida, along with state political news from Tallahassee.

References

External links

 
 
 

NDB
Radio stations established in 1948
1948 establishments in Florida